Britannica's Tales Around the World (also referred to as Britannica's Fairy Tales from Around the World and Familiar Tales Around the World) is a direct-to-video animated educational series that was released in 1990.

Premise 
Britannica's Tales Around the World, written by Douglas Lieberman, teaches kids a familiar fairy tale from around the world, followed by two lesser-known stories that share a similar theme. The series opens up in a computer-generated landscape, containing a floating castle and the planet Earth in the background. Pat Morita would explain the significance of each of the three stories and then the camera zooms to a country on Earth where the fairy tale was traditionally told.

List of videos

Home video

United States
These tapes were released by Kids Klassics and GoodTimes Entertainment.
Cinderella and Other Tales
Sleeping Beauty and Other Tales
Beauty and the Beast and Other Tales
Rumpelstiltskin and Other Tales
Hansel and Gretel and Other Tales
Rapunzel and Other Tales

These DVDs were released by Encyclopædia Britannica on their online store.
Beauty and the Beast, Sleeping Beauty, and Other Animated Tales
Cinderella, Rumpelstiltskin, and Other Animated Tales
Hansel and Gretel, Rapunzel, and Other Animated Tales
Aesop's Animated Fables

United Kingdom
These DVDs were released by Pegasus and Brightspark Entertainment.
Beauty and the Beast, Sleeping Beauty, and Other Animated Tales
Cinderella, Rumpelstiltskin, and Other Animated Tales
Hansel and Gretel, Rapunzel, and Other Animated Tales*
Aesop's Animated Fables

(*) Re-released by Brightspark under the title "Tangled Up".

Controversy
When Brightspark rereleased episodes of Britannica's Tales Around the World under the title Tangled Up, The Walt Disney Company accused the company for "misleading consumers with numerous releases that confuse and undermine the trust those consumers have in Disney", especially when the rerelease contained a similar title and cover artwork to Disney's 2010 film Tangled.

References

Direct-to-video television series

External links 
Britannica's Tales Around the World at IMDb